The Los Angeles Rams are a professional American football team based in Los Angeles, California. They are a member of the West Division of the  National Football Conference (NFC) in the National Football League (NFL). The Rams played their first season in 1936 in Cleveland, Ohio. During World War II, the Rams did not play during the 1943 season because of wartime restrictions and shortages. The team became known as the Los Angeles Rams after it moved to Los Angeles, California in 1946. After the 1979 season, the Rams moved south to the suburbs in nearby Orange County, playing their home games at Anaheim Stadium in Anaheim for 15 seasons (1980–1994) but kept their Los Angeles name. The club moved east to St. Louis, Missouri before the 1995 season, and moved back to Southern California before the 2016 season.

The Rams franchise has had 26 head coaches throughout its history. Damon Wetzel became the first head coach of the Cleveland Rams in 1936. He served for one season before he was replaced by Hugo Bezdek in 1937 as the Rams became a National Football League franchise. But after losing 13 of 14 games, Bezdek was dismissed and replaced by Art Lewis three games into the 1938 season. Dutch Clark, who was later one of the charter inductees into the Pro Football Hall of Fame, became head coach of the Rams and coached the team for four seasons until the franchise suspended operations for the 1943 season. When the Rams resumed play in 1944, Aldo "Buff" Donelli became head coach and was 4-4 in his only season. In 1945, Adam Walsh became head coach and proceeded to lead the Cleveland Rams to a 9-1 record and the franchise's first NFL championship. Walsh was named the league's Coach of the Year.

Despite the title, the Rams' faltering financial fortunes in Cleveland sparked a move to Los Angeles by owner Dan Reeves. Walsh remained head coach, but left after the Rams finished 6-4-1 in their inaugural season on the west coast. Walsh was succeeded by Bob Snyder, who went 6-6 in his only season in 1947. Clark Shaughnessy took over for the next two seasons and led the Rams to the 1949 NFL Championship game (losing to the Philadelphia Eagles), but he was dismissed for reportedly for creating "internal friction" within the club. Line coach Joe Stydahar was elevated to head coach and guided the Rams back to the NFL championship game in 1950, where they again lost, this time to the Cleveland Browns 30-28. A year later, the teams would rematch, but this time the Rams prevailed 24-17 over the Browns to win the 1951 NFL Championship. Although he was successful as head coach, an internal dispute between Stydahar and assistant coach Hamp Pool spilled over into the public and Stydahar resigned one game into the 1952 season. Pool was elevated to head coach and led the Rams to their fourth straight postseason appearance in 1953, this time losing to the Detroit Lions in a playoff. Pool stayed as head coach for two more seasons before giving way to Sid Gillman, who led the Rams to the 1955 NFL Championship game where they again lost to Cleveland. Although his innovative offensive style would influence pro football for decades to come, Gillman never equaled the success of his first season, and left after five seasons to coach the American Football League's Los Angeles Chargers. The Rams continued without success under head coaches Bob Waterfield and Harland Svare.

In 1966, George Allen was hired as head coach and instantly turned around the Rams' on-field fortunes. In his five seasons, Allen never had a losing record and led the Rams to division titles in 1967 and 1969. But the Rams fell both times to the eventual NFL champion, and that combined with ongoing friction between himself and owner Dan Reeves, made Allen's situation unstable. Allen was originally fired in 1968, but after players interceded on his behalf, Reeves retained him for two more seasons. After failing to make the playoffs in 1970, Allen was released once his contract expired, and he was replaced by former UCLA coach Tommy Prothro, who led the Rams for two unsuccessful seasons.

By this time, Dan Reeves had died, and the franchise was then sold to Robert Irsay, who then immediately traded the franchise to Carroll Rosenbloom in exchange for the Baltimore Colts. Following the 1972 season, Rosenbloom dismissed Prothro and brought in as his replacement Chuck Knox. Installing his trademark "Ground Chuck" offense, Knox led the Rams to a 12-2 record and their first NFC West title, and was named NFL Coach of the Year for 1973. Los Angeles would repeat as division champions four more times under Knox, while also reaching the NFC Championship Game three consecutive years from 1974 through 1976. But the Rams were frustrated each time in their attempt to reach the Super Bowl, and after an upset loss to Minnesota in a 1977 NFC Divisional Playoff, Knox left Los Angeles to take the head coaching job with the Buffalo Bills.

Although he considered hiring future Hall of Fame coach Bill Walsh (then the head coach at Stanford, Rosenbloom brought back George Allen to great fanfare. However, Allen's rigid ways clashed with both players on the roster and team administration, including general manager Don Klosterman. The effect of the turmoil on the team was evident, and after the Rams played poorly in a pair of exhibition losses at home, Rosenbloom fired Allen and promoted defensive coordinator Ray Malavasi to head coach.

Malavasi, the lone holdover from Knox's staff, was well-liked by players, and the chemistry showed as the Rams roared to a 7-0 start in 1978 on the way to a 12-4 record and the team's sixth straight NFC West title. Los Angeles finally defeated the Minnesota Vikings in the playoffs, but again were denied a chance to play in the Super Bowl when they were shut out 28-0 by the Dallas Cowboys in the 1978 NFC Championship Game. Injuries racked the Rams at numerous positions in 1979 and stumbled to a 9-7 mark, which was still good enough for Los Angeles to claim a then-record seventh straight division championship. In the playoffs, the Rams upset the Cowboys in Dallas, then shut out the host Tampa Bay Buccaneers to win the NFC Championship and, at last, advance to play in the Super Bowl. Though they were more than 10-point underdogs to the defending champion Pittsburgh Steelers in Super Bowl XIV, the Rams had the advantage of playing in the Rose Bowl, and led their opponent after each of the first three quarters. But big plays on offense and a critical interception late in the fourth quarter sealed the game for the Steelers 31-19. In 1980, the Rams moved to Anaheim Stadium and after an 0-2 start, won 11 of the next 14 to earn their eighth straight trip to the NFC playoffs, where they were defeated at Dallas. A contract dispute with quarterback Vince Ferragamo marred the 1981 season, as the Rams fell to 6-10. Next season was even worse, as Los Angeles finished with a 2-7 record in 1982, which was disrupted by a players strike that lasted 57 days. Malavasi was then fired after five seasons.

Rams owner Georgia Frontiere, who had taken over the team following the death of her husband Carroll Rosenbloom in 1979, hired former USC head coach John Robinson for the 1983 season. Bringing a host of former Trojan assistants with him, Robinson installed his trademark running game that worked perfectly with the Rams' powerful offensive line and explosive running back Eric Dickerson. Robinson led the Rams to playoff appearances in six of the next seven seasons, including an NFC West title in 1985 as well as reaching the NFC Championship Games in 1985 and 1989. But back-to-back losing seasons in 1990 and 1991 doomed Robinson, who stepped down after a 3-13 campaign. Robinson ended his NFL career with the most wins (79) in Rams franchise history.

Again, the Rams had the opportunity to go with a well-regarded young offensive mind, having interviewed then-San Francisco 49ers offensive coordinator Mike Holmgren. But as her late husband had once done, Georgia Frontiere opted to play it safe by bringing back Chuck Knox, who had just weeks earlier stepped down from coaching the Seattle Seahawks. But Knox was unable to recreate the magic of his earlier tenure with the Rams, as Los Angeles finished 6-10 in 1992 and got progressively worse each following season. Additionally, Frontiere openly flirted with a possible franchise move to St. Louis, and Knox was fired following the Rams' 4-12 finish in 1994.

Making a fresh start in St. Louis, former Oregon head coach Rich Brooks was installed as head coach. After struggling to win, Brooks was fired after just two seasons and replaced by Dick Vermeil. The former Philadelphia Eagles head coach, Vermeil had not coached on any level since retiring in 1982. But after two double-digit loss seasons, Vermeil shepherded the Rams to remarkable turnaround in 1999. Led by the arrival of running back Marshall Faulk and the emergence of quarterback Kurt Warner, the St. Louis Rams took the NFL by storm and went on to win Super Bowl XXXIV 23-16 over the Tennessee Titans. Vermeil then retired and was succeeded by his offensive coordinator Mike Martz, who would ultimately lead the Rams back to the Super Bowl. But after being upset 20-17 by the New England Patriots in Super Bowl XXXVI and then losing to the Carolina Panthers in double overtime during the 2003 NFC Divisional Playoff, Martz began to fall out of favor with Rams management. Five games into the 2005 season, Martz took a leave of absence to treat a bacterial infection in his heart. For the remainder of the season, Martz was replaced on an interim basis by Joe Vitt. The Rams finished 6-10 overall and both Martz and Vitt were fired following the season.

Scott Linehan became the new head coach of the St. Louis Rams in 2006 and showed some promise during an 8-8 campaign in which the Rams rallied to win their final three games to finish just one game behind Seattle in the NFC West standings. But St. Louis faltered to 3-13 in 2007 and after an 0-4 start in 2008, Linehan was fired. Defensive coordinator Jim Haslett was elevated to interim head coach, having previously been head coach with the New Orleans Saints. Though he began his brief tenure with two straight wins, the Rams under Haslett ended the 2008 season with 10 straight losses, and Haslett was not considered as a candidate for the permanent head coaching position. The Rams then hired Steve Spagnuolo as head coach after Spagnuolo's successful stretch running the New York Giants defense. But as dismal as St. Louis was in 2008, when the Rams went 2-14, it was even worse in 2009 as St. Louis went 1-15, with only a 17-10 win at Detroit staving off a winless season. Fortunes improved in 2010 thanks to a strong season from rookie quarterback Sam Bradford, as the Rams went 7-9 and were in the playoff hunt until the season's final week, when Seattle defeated them 16-6 to win the NFC West. But the Rams reverted to their losing form in 2011 with a 2-14 record. After losing their final seven games, Spagnuolo was fired along with general manager Billy Devaney.

New Rams owner Stan Kroenke made his first hire with former Houston Oilers/Tennessee Titans head coach Jeff Fisher taking over. The Rams did show overall improvement during a 7-8-1 season. But it was the best that Fisher would be able to do, as the Rams went 7-9, 6-10, and 7-9 in their final seasons in St. Louis. Following the end of the 2015 season, the Rams were approved to return to Los Angeles, ending the NFL's 21-year absence from the market. Fisher, who had guided the Oilers/Titans franchise in its relocation from Houston to Memphis and ultimately to Nashville, was retained and shepherded the Rams through the turmoil of the move. And while the newly-rebranded Los Angeles Rams began the 2016 season 3-1, the team would win only one of its remaining 12 games. Though he had acquired strong talent in successive drafts with Aaron Donald in 2014 and Todd Gurley in 2015 Fisher was unable to put together a consistently winning combination on the field. And after a 42-14 loss at home to the Atlanta Falcons that tied him for the most regular season losses by a coach in NFL history, Fisher was fired on December 12, 2016. Special teams coordinator John Fassel was named interim head coach, but was winless in the final three games of the season.

The Rams interviewed a variety of candidates, but surprised many observers by hiring then 30-year-old Sean McVay as head coach on January 12, 2017. With a work ethic and reservoir of knowledge that belied his age, McVay refashioned the team in his own image. The youngest head coach in modern league history hired longtime NFL coach Wade Phillips as defensive coordinator and retained Fassel as special teams coordinator. The results were overwhelmingly positive as McVay's new-look Rams went 11-5 in 2017 and clinched their first NFC West title since 2003, and McVay was named NFL Coach of the Year. In 2018, the Rams improved to 13-3, tying for the second-most regular season wins in team history, and qualified to play in Super Bowl LIII against the New England Patriots.

Sid Gillman, George Allen and Dick Vermeil have been inducted into the Pro Football Hall of Fame as coaches. To date, Vermeil and Sean McVay are the only coach to win a Super Bowl championship in franchise history.

Key

Coaches
Note: Statistics are accurate through the end of the 2021 NFL season.

Notes

 A running total of the number of Rams head coaches. Thus, any head coach who has two or more terms is only counted once.
 Damon Wetzel was a player-coach for the Rams in 1936.
 Hugo Bezdek was released after three games in 1938.
 The Rams suspended operation during the 1943 season because of wartime restrictions and shortages.
 Joe Stydahar resigned after one game in 1952.
 Bob Waterfield resigned after eight games in 1962.
 Knox's full coaching record with the Rams is 118 regular season games coached with a record of 69–48–1 and a W–L percentage of 
 Mike Martz took medical leave after five games in 2005.
 Fisher's full coaching record with the Rams is 77 regular season games coached with a record of 31–45–1 and a W–L percentage of 
 The Rams named John Fassel as interim head coach on December 12, 2016.

References

Los Angeles Rams
Head coaches